Diplodoma adspersella is a moth of the Psychidae family. It is found in Germany, Austria, Italy, Hungary and Romania.

The forewings are brownish-grey with a yellow lustre and small pale yellowish spots. The hindwings are light grey.

The larvae feed on mosses, lichens and dead insects.

References

Moths described in 1870
Psychidae
Moths of Europe